United Nations Security Council Resolution 166, adopted on October 25, 1961, after examining the application of the Mongolian People's Republic for membership in the United Nations the Council recommended to the General Assembly that the Mongolian People's Republic be admitted.

Resolution 166 was approved by nine votes to none, with one abstention from the United States. The Republic of China did not participate in voting.

See also
List of United Nations Security Council Resolutions 101 to 200 (1953–1965)
History of Mongolia

References
Text of the Resolution at undocs.org

External links
 

 0166
Mongolian People's Republic
 0166
 0166
1961 in Mongolia
October 1961 events